

Overview
Admas University commenced its operation in Hargeisa, Somaliland, in September 2006 as the first private Higher Education Institution in Somaliland on the basis of two legally binding Memoranda of Understanding. The first was drawn by and between the Ministries of Education of the two neigh-boring Horn of Africa Countries: Ethiopia and Somaliland while the second one was drawn by and between the owners and operators of the respective institutions: Admas University, Ethiopia and Admas University, Hargeisa.

Initially, Admas University, Hargeisa, started serving the society with a small intake of about 150 students in four fields of studies in undergraduate degree programs namely, Information and Communication Technology (ICT), Accounting, Economics, and Management.  The University then exhibited a tremendous growth and expansion in the following years to the point where it now maintains over 3,000 students attending their studies both at undergraduate and postgraduate levels in its five nearby campuses.

Throughout its existence in the last sixteen years, the University has produced more than 7,000 graduates in various bachelor's and master's degrees as well as postgraduate diploma programs. A fairly good proportion of these graduates are now holding key positions in Somaliland's private, public and nongovernment sectors which enabled the university to highly contribute to the country's social and economic development.

All the currently offered eleven undergraduate and seven postgraduate programs are recognized and accredited by Somaliland's National Commission for Higher Education as well as Federal Democratic of Ethiopia's Education and Training Authority (ETA), which was formerly known as Higher Education Relevance and Quality Agency (HERQA).

The University is also running joint academic postgraduate programs in collaboration with certain foreign universities in addition to facilitating scholarship opportunities for great number of Somalilanders to support their career development.

References

External links

 Hargeisa
Educational institutions established in 2006
2006 establishments in Ethiopia